Tiina Karoliina Elovaara (born 11 December 1986 in Tampere) is a former member of the parliament of Finland, elected 22 April 2015; she was not reelected in the 2019 elections. She represented the True Finns until June 2017, when Elovaara and 19 other MPs left the Finns Party parliamentary group to found their own parliamentary group, which would later be known as the Blue Reform. On 16 December 2017, Elovaara was elected as the Second Vice Chairman of the Blue Reform.

References 

1986 births
Living people
Politicians from Tampere
Finns Party politicians
Blue Reform politicians
Members of the Parliament of Finland (2015–19)
21st-century Finnish women politicians
Women members of the Parliament of Finland